Operation Auxin was an Australian police operation in September 2004, leading to the arrest of almost 200 people on charges of child pornography. These people were all accused of purchasing child pornography over the Internet, using their credit cards, from Belarusian crime syndicates, the credit card payments having been processed by a company named Landslide.com in Fort Lauderdale, Florida. Among the accused were people holding positions of trust in the community, such as police officers (including one  officer assigned to investigate child pornography), members of the military, teachers and ministers of religion. Several of the suspects committed suicide. It was the follow-up to the U.S. FBI operation Operation Falcon.

The initial credit card evidence used in the investigation has since been widely debunked due to there being no established link between a credit card being used and actual pornography being downloaded. Additionally, multiple cases of credit card fraud involving organised crime syndicates has also raised the possibility that credit card numbers retrieved from Landslide.com may have been used by a third party and not their owners at all.

Similar operations in the UK have come under intense fire both from those wrongfully convicted and from civil rights groups.

References

Auxin, Operation
Law enforcement in Australia
Crime in Australia
2004 in Australia
Law enforcement operations